Selim (1802–1825) was a British Thoroughbred racehorse. He was owned by the Prince of Wales, D. Radcliffe and later Arthur Shakespear. After retiring from racing he became a successful stallion and was British Champion sire in 1814. His progeny included Azor, Medora, Sultan and Turquoise.

Background
Selim was a chestnut colt bred by General Sparrow and foaled in 1802. He was sired by Buzzard, who won the Craven Stakes twice and the Jockey Club Plate. Selim's dam was the bay Alexander mare, a daughter of Alexander. She also produced Castrel, Rubens and Bronze (all of whom for full-siblings to Selim.

Racing career

1806: Four-year-old season
Selim did not race until he was four years old. He made his debut on 29 July 1806 at Brighthelmston, where he beat the colt Wormwood over a mile for 50 guineas. His only other race of the season was in the first class October Oatlands Stakes over a mile at Newmarket. Now the property of D. Radcliffe, he started the 7/4 favourite in the field of five and won the race from Captain Absolute, with second-favourite Lydia finishing in third place.

1807: Five-year-old season
Selim returned to the track as a five-year-old in the Craven Stakes at Newmarket on 30 March 1807, when he started favourite of the eleven-strong field. Selim won the race from Walton and Currycomb, who finished in second and third respectively. Two days later he finished second to Lydia in the £50 Subscription Place. He then won the third class October Oatlands Stakes at Newmarket from Gaiety, after starting the odds-on favourite of the five runners.

1808: Six-year-old season
Selim beat Lydia for 200 guineas in April 1808 at the Newmarket Craven meeting. He was then acquired by Arthur Shakespear and was beaten by Tim in a match race at Newmarket. Tim was apparently carrying much less weight than Selim. He lost another match race in October, this time to Earl Grosvenor's Violante. This was Selim's last race and he was then retired to stud.

Stud career
In his first season at stud Selim stood at Six Mile Bottom near Newmarket for a fee of ten guineas and half a guinea for the groom. The following year he moved to Newmarket itself and his fee doubled to twenty guineas and one guinea to the groom. He went on to become a successful stallion and was British Champion sire in 1814. His progeny included Epsom Derby winner Azor, Epsom Oaks winners Medora and Turquoise, 2000 Guineas winners Nicolo and Turcoman and an unnamed filly that won the 1000 Guineas. Selim also sired six-time Champion sire Sultan. He died in 1825.

Pedigree

* Selim was inbred 3x4 to Herod. This means that the stallion appears once in the third generation and once in the fourth generation of his pedigree.

Sire line tree

Selim
Fandago
Champion
Azor
Sultan
Augustus
Mahmoud
Hoemus
Beiram
Phlegon
Leopold
Phaeton
Alpheus
Evenus
Despot
Hooton
Brill
Divan
Ishmael
Ilderim
Ishmaelite
Harold
Dr. Jenner
Vaccination
Hambledon
The Star of Erin
Abd El Kader
Burgundy
Old Malt
Shanbally
Glencoe
Thornhill
Winnebago
Glencoe (Howard)
Union
Highlander
Everlasting
Star Davis
Jerome Edger
Metaire
Day Star
Darby
Vandal
Jack the Barber
Revill
Volcian
Therit
Virgil
Pompey Payne
Versailles
Survivor
Council Bluffs
Vagabond
Vicksburg
Voltigeur
Little Arthur
Pryor
Bay Dick
Bay Wood
Bonnie Laddie
Foreigner
France
King Bird
Glencoe Jr.
Walnut
O'Meara
Trumeter
Young Trumpeter
Glencoe (Hunter)
Ibrahim
Bay Middleton
Bramble
Farintosh
Gaper
Bay Momus
Pastoral
Collingwood
Cowl
The Confessor
The Friar
The Grand Inquisitor
Capucine
Joy
Gabbler
Planet
Aster
The Flying Dutchman
Ellington
Fly-By-Night
Peter Wilkens
Flying Pieman
Ignoramus
Purston
Amsterdam
Duneany
Glenbuck
The Rover
Cape Flyaway
Tom Bowline
Winton
Young Dutchman
Ellerton
Romulus
Walloon
Dollar
Tourmalet
Guillame Le Taciturne
Dutch Skater
Massinissa
Jarnac
St. Aubyn
Hesperus
Sir Birtram
Diomedes
Barbatus
Vanderdecken
Andover
Craymond
Walkington
The Hermit
Freetrader
Milton
Anton
Hampton
Achmet
Dardanelles
Hibiscus
Jereed
Great Heart
Nat
The Bishop of Romford's Cob
The Free Lance
Sultan Jr.
Wisdom
Caesar
Clarion
Kremlin
Scutari
Feramorz
De Vere
Langar
Felt
Godolphin
Fang
Philip the First
King Dan
Ratcatcher
Stockport
Cotton Lord
Post Tempore
Elis
Jordan
Kentuckian
Master Wags
La Cloture
Nat
Epirus
Pyrrhus the First
King Alfred
New Warrior
Magus
Snowden
Mouravieff
Ringer
Pitsford
Ramornie
Ephesus
Emilius
Grecian
Warhawk
Buzzard
Camden
Little Harry
Epaminondas
Lord Stafford
Epidaurus
Montreal
Langar
Flagsman
Galanthus
Marcellus
Nicolo
Saracen
The Moslem
Turcoman
Roscius

References

1802 racehorse births
1825 racehorse deaths
British Champion Thoroughbred Sires
Racehorses bred in the United Kingdom
Racehorses trained in the United Kingdom
Thoroughbred family 2-n
Byerley Turk sire line